The mayor of Albuquerque, New Mexico is the chief executive officer of the city, elected for a four-year term. There are no term limits for the mayor. Under the New Mexico State Constitution, municipal elections are nonpartisan. The 30th and current Mayor is Tim Keller, a Democrat.

History
Henry N. Jaffa was elected the first mayor of Albuquerque in 1885. The city was governed by a mayor until the transition to a City Commission government in 1917. Under this system, the leader of city government in Albuquerque was the Chairman of the City Commission. In 1975, due to large growth in the city, voters replaced the Commission system with a City Council system. After the change occurred, voters once again elected a mayor.

Duties and powers
Albuquerque has a strong mayor council form of government, giving the mayor the position of chief executive of the city. The mayor is given the authority to appoint and remove officials from city posts, and is required to propose a budget each year. Most of the mayor's appointments and proposals are subject to approval by the Albuquerque City Council, but the mayor has the power of veto or approval of City Council legislation. The organization of the mayor's office changes with administration, but is almost always governed by a chief of staff, deputy chief of staff, and director of communications.

List of mayors

Mayor (1885–1917)

Chairman of the City Commission (1917–1974)

Mayor (since 1974)

See also
 Timeline of Albuquerque, New Mexico

References

External links
 City of Albuquerque – Mayor's office

Mayor
Albuquerque